Midland Hockey Union are a District operating within the Scottish Hockey Union and cover North East Fife, Angus, Dundee and Perthshire. 

Midland operate local leagues both indoor and outdoor for both women and men.

Youth Squads

Midland have youth squads for the following age groups

U14's Mixed
U15's Boys
U15's Girls
U16's Boys
U16's Girls
U18's Boys
U18's Girls

Clubs

There are a number of clubs operating within Midland District - these include

Blairgowrie Ladies Hockey Club - Ladies only
Brechin Thistle Ladies Hockey Club - Ladies only
Dundee Wanderers Hockey Club - Ladies and men
Dundee University - Ladies and men
FMGM Monarchs Hockey Club - Ladies and men
Grove Menzieshill - Ladies and men
Harris Academy FP's Hockey Club - Everyone welcome
Kinross Hockey Club - Ladies and juniors. Men's section plays in East district. 
Madras FP's Hockey Club - Ladies and men
Perthshire Hockey Club - Ladies and men
St. Andrews University - Ladies and men
Stirling University - Ladies only

External links

Midland Hockey Union; shows leagues, fixtures and results.

Field hockey governing bodies in Scotland